Xhulio Jaupi (born 30 September 1992) is a former Albanian professional footballer. He announced his retirement on 19 May 2020 at the age of 27, as he decided to move to Italy to be with his family.

Honours
Elbasani
Albanian First Division (1): 2013-14

References

1992 births
Living people
People from Belsh
Association football midfielders
Albanian footballers
KF Elbasani players
KS Shkumbini Peqin players
KF Korabi Peshkopi players
KS Turbina Cërrik players
Kategoria Superiore players
Kategoria e Parë players